Buttermere and Ennerdale is a National Trust property located in the Lake District of Cumbria, England.

External links
Buttermere Valley information at the National Trust
Ennerdale information at the National Trust

National Trust properties in the Lake District